Ann Marie Hardy is an American epidemiologist and microbiologist who served as the human research protections officer at the National Institutes of Health Office of Extramural Programs.

Education 
Ann Marie Hardy completed a master of science degree in microbiology and a doctor of public health in epidemiology in 1983 at the University of Pittsburgh Graduate School of Public Health. Her dissertation was titled Infections in renal transplant recipients receiving cyclosporine.

Career and research 
Hardy spent 5 years at the Centers for Disease Control and Prevention working on AIDS surveillance and epidemiology. She then spent 12 years at the National Center for Health Statistics in various roles on the National Health Interview Survey.

Hardy served as a scientific review officer at the Center for Scientific Review (CSR) for 7 years in the Health of the Population Integrated Review Group (HOP IRG) where she established the Biostatistical Methods and Research Design study section. She was the deputy chief of the HOP IRG for her last 3 years at CSR.

In 2008, she joined the National Institutes of Health (NIH) Office of Extramural Programs (OEP) in the Office of Extramural Research (OER) as an extramural human research protections officer serving as the NIH coordinator for Certificates of Confidentiality.

Hardy's areas of expertise include human subjects protections, infectious disease epidemiology, and health survey methods.

References 

Living people
Year of birth missing (living people)
Place of birth missing (living people)
National Institutes of Health people
21st-century American biologists
21st-century American women scientists
American medical researchers
American women biologists
20th-century American women scientists
20th-century American biologists
Centers for Disease Control and Prevention people
American microbiologists
University of Pittsburgh School of Public Health alumni
American epidemiologists
American women epidemiologists
Women medical researchers
Women microbiologists
Microbiologists